Viktor Bjarki Arnarsson (born 22 January 1983 in Reykjavík, Iceland) is a retired football player who last played for Handknattleiksfélag Kópavogs.

Career
After being awarded 'Player of the Year' in the Icelandic Úrvalsdeild with Víkingur, he signed for Norwegian side Lillestrøm in 2006, but was loaned to KR Reykjavik for the 2008-season, and then went back to Lillestrøm after the season.

In 2009, he signed a one-year contract with Nybergsund IL-Trysil in the Norwegian Adeccoligaen following his spell in Sweden.

After being released from Nybergsund IL-Trysil, Arnarsson went back to Iceland to play for KR Reykjavik and Fram Reykjavik before ultimately returning to his home club Víkingur.

Viktor previously played for TOP Oss in the Dutch Eerste Divisie.

References

Arnarsson, Viktor Bjarki
Arnarsson, Viktor Bjarki
Arnarsson, Viktor Bjarki
Arnarsson, Viktor Bjarki
Knattspyrnufélagið Víkingur players
Icelandic footballers
Iceland youth international footballers
Icelandic expatriate footballers
Arnarsson, Viktor Bjarki
Arnarsson, Viktor Bjarki
Sportspeople from Reykjavík
Úrvalsdeild karla (football) players